Piddington is a village and civil parish about  southeast of Bicester in Oxfordshire, England. It lies close to the border with Buckinghamshire. Its toponym has been attributed to the Old English Pyda's tun. The 2011 Census recorded the parish's population as 370.

Manor
Just before the Norman Conquest of England, Hacun, a Dane, held the manor of Piddington, and also the nearby manor of Merton. The Domesday Book records that by 1086 Judith, Countess of Huntingdon, a niece of William I of England held the manor. After the Revolt of the Earls in 1075 Judith's husband Waltheof, Earl of Northumbria was executed and William the Conqueror betrothed her to Simon I de Senlis. She refused to marry him and fled England, so William confiscated her estates and allowed Simon to marry Judith's eldest daughter Maud. Simon received estates including Merton and Piddington as part of the honour of Huntingdon.

In 1152 Simon II de Senlis inherited Piddington and almost immediately granted it to the Priory of St Frideswide, Oxford. In 1153 Simon II died, and his heir King Malcolm IV of Scotland, confirmed the grant of Piddington to the Priory. However, Malcolm's heir-apparent William the Lion took Piddington back from the Priory. In about 1174 Henry II deprived William of all his titles and lands in England and granted the Earldom of Huntingdon to Simon III de Senlis. Simon acknowledged the Priory's claim to Piddington but continued to hold the overlordship himself, even ignoring a Papal bull upholding the Priory's rights.

Joan of Piddington had held the manor of Simon II de Senlis, and in about 1183 she married Aubrey de Dammartin, son of Albéric I de Mello and Dammartin, Grand Chamberman of France. After Aubrey's death the Crown held Piddington in escheat for several years before it passed to his heir, Reynold de Dammartin. In the Anglo-French War of 1202–14 Reynold supported Philip II of France against King John, for which he was deprived of his English estates. In 1213 Reynold's estates were restored but when he died in 1227 Henry III seized them again.

In 1270 Henry III granted Piddington to a Breton, Alan Plukenet, in exchange for a manor in the New Forest. In 1309 his son, Alan II, granted Piddington to Hugh le Despenser, 1st Earl of Winchester, who in turn granted it to John de Hadlow, lord of nearby Boarstall in Buckinghamshire. In 1326 Despenser was executed for rebelling against Edward II and forfeited his estates, but de Hadlow was allowed to keep Piddington until he died in 1346. However, Sybil, widow of Alan Plukenet, successfully claimed a third of Piddington as dower. Also, in 1331 St Frideswide's Priory began a lawsuit to recover Piddington from John de Hadlow.

In 1337 Edward III granted Piddington to Nicholas de la Beche of Aldworth and in 1340 de la Beche was licensed to grant Piddington to Sir John Sutton, lord of Dudley. In 1347 Sir John was licensed to grant Piddington to John de Peyto for life, with reversion to Sir John thereafter. Title was then disputed between the Sutton and de Peyto families, but in 1359 the Priory finally succeeded in regaining the manor. St Frideswide's Priory retained Piddington until 1525, when Cardinal Wolsey suppressed the Priory to found his Cardinal's College. In 1530 Henry VIII deposed Wolsey and in 1532 Piddington passed to Christ Church, Oxford.

However, in 1553 Piddington was granted to Thomas Dynham, lord of the manors of Brill and Boarstall in Buckinghamshire. In 1634 Thomas's grandson John Dynham died leaving his estates to his daughters Mary and Alice. Piddington seems to have passed to Mary, as her daughter Margaret Lewis was lady of the manor in 1661. Her daughter Mary Jephson inherited Piddington in 1672 and had married Sir John Aubrey, 2nd Baronet by 1691. On her death in 1717 Mary's stepson Sir John Aubrey, 3rd Baronet inherited Piddington, and it remained with the Aubrey baronets until Sir Thomas Digby Aubrey, 7th Baronet died in 1856 and the title became extinct.

A cousin of Sir Thomas, Elizabeth Sophia Ricketts, inherited Piddington. Her son Charles Aubrey Ricketts inherited the manor and took the name Charles Aubrey Aubrey. He died in 1901, leaving Piddington to Sir Henry Aubrey-Fletcher, 4th Baronet, who was the great grandson of Sir John Aubrey, 3rd Baronet. Sir Henry Aubrey-Fletcher, 6th Baronet, also known as the detective novelist Henry Wade, inherited the manor in 1937 and still held it in the 1950s.

Church and chapel

Church of England

Piddington was originally part of the ecclesiastical parish of Ambrosden. Until the English Reformation, Piddington villagers used to process to the chapel on Christian feast days. The last ruins of the chapel are reported to have disappeared in 1800.

The chapel of Saint Nicholas in Piddington is known to have existed by 1309. It is now Piddington's Church of England parish church. Its Early English chancel was built in about 1300, but has ornate Decorated Gothic sedilia and Easter Sepulchre carved in about 1350. There is a canonical sundial on the south wall. In the 14th century the Decorated Gothic south aisle was added, with a four-bay arcade and some new two-light windows, but also re-using two Early English lancet windows presumably from the south wall of the nave.

A number of Perpendicular Gothic windows were later added to the nave and one to the north wall of the chancel. The present belltower was built in the 16th century. St. Nicholas' parish church was repaired in 1826 and restored in 1855. In 1898 it was restored again under the architect John Oldrid Scott, whose alterations included replacing the chancel arch. A 14th-century wall painting of Saint Christopher on the north wall of the nave was discovered in 1896 and restored in 1935. St. Nicholas' church is a Grade II* listed building.

The west tower has a ring of five bells. Edward Hemins of Bicester cast the tenor bell 1729 in and the fourth bell in 1738. Llewellins and James of Bristol cast the treble, second and third bells in 1887, the year of Queen Victoria's Golden Jubilee.  St Nicholas' parish is part of the Benefice of the Ray Valley, along with the parishes of Ambrosden, Charlton-on-Otmoor, Islip, Merton, Murcott, Noke, Oddington and Woodeaton.

Congregational chapel
The Congregational chapel in the village was founded in 1825 and enlarged at a later date. It was still used for worship in 1951 but has since been converted into a private house.

Social and economic history

A Sunday school in Piddington was founded in 1818. It became a day school supported by the National Society for Promoting Religious Education in 1858, and a new school building was erected in 1863. In 1925 it was reorganised as a junior and infants' school. It was still open in 1952 but has since closed.

The line passes within a few hundred metres of Piddington. British Railways closed the station in 1953 but the railway remains open as part of the Chiltern Main Line.

In 1941, the Bicester Military Railway was built. It connects with the Varsity Line just west of Bicester, runs through the villages of Ambrosden and Arncott and terminates at Piddington, serving various military depots en route. It remains in use today.

John Drinkwater (June 1, 1882– March 25, 1937) who became one of the Dymock poets and a playwright working with the Birmingham Repertory Theatre, is buried in St Nicholas' churchyard. He often visited relatives in Piddington and mentioned Piddington in several poems, including 'A New Ballard Of Charity':
       "...the primroses of Bagley Wood,
        old apple trees at Piddington."
and 'The Patriot':
       "... fields below the rookery
        that comfortably looks upon
        the little street of Piddington."
His gravestone is engraved with words from 'Amaranth':-
       "In some new brain the sleeping dust will waken
        Courage and love that conquered and were done
        Called from a night by thought of man forsaken
        Will know again the gladness of the sun."
John Drinkwater was related to Flora Thompson through their ancestors: Drinkwater's great-great-grandfather and Flora's great-great-grandmother were siblings. Flora Thompson's (née Timms) ancestors the Shaws and the Wallingtons, yeoman farmers, lived in Piddington and are buried outside the porch of the church.  Although now very weathered, the oldest gravestone is of John Shaw (1691-1767). Other family graves include one of Elizabeth Shaw née Beck (1762-1791), Flora's great-great-grandmother whose elder brother was Thomas Beck (1756-1838) John Drinkwater's great-great-grandfather.

Flora Thompson's paternal grandmother Martha Wallington (1816-1888) was born in the old farmhouse now a private house at the junction with Widnell Lane. Martha was orphaned at an early age when her mother and three of her siblings died in 1824, followed the next year by the death of her father. Their deaths were probably attributed to infected water from the farmhouse well. Martha was eight, and her orphaned siblings (Edward 17 years, Elizabeth 13 years, Leonard 12 years, and Clementine the youngest at three year) appeared to have raised themselves after uncles could not help them due to their own 'indifferent circumstances'. Martha Wallington married Flora's paternal grandfather Thomas Timms, whose son Albert Timms married Emma Dibber, Flora's mother.

Amenities
Piddington had a public house, the Seven Stars, which has since been turned into the Sunset and Stars Restaurant. Piddington also has a village hall.

References

Sources

External links

Civil parishes in Oxfordshire
Villages in Oxfordshire